Catawissa Creek is a  long creek flowing into the Susquehanna River with 26 named tributaries, of which 19 are direct tributaries. The creek flows through Luzerne, Schuylkill, and Columbia counties in Pennsylvania. The tributaries include seventeen runs, six creeks, and three hollows (unnamed streams named after named valleys that they flow through). By length, the five largest tributaries of Catawissa Creek are Little Catawissa Creek, Tomhicken Creek, Scotch Run, Beaver Run, and Messers Run. By watershed area, the five largest tributaries are Tomhicken Creek, Little Catawissa Creek, Beaver Run, Scotch Run, and Messers Run.

Various species of fish inhabit most of the tributaries of Catawissa Creek. The Pennsylvania Department of Environmental Protection considers eleven tributaries of the creek to be Coldwater Fisheries. Another is a Coldwater Fishery for part of its length and a High-Quality Coldwater Fishery for the other part. An additional twelve tributaries are High-Quality Coldwater Fisheries for their entire lengths. The Pennsylvania Fish and Boat Commission considers eleven tributaries to be Class A Wild Trout Waters. Five tributaries have been observed to be devoid of fish life, and one other is suspected to lack fish as well. Most of the remaining tributaries are inhabited by between one and fourteen species of fish.

The tributaries of Catawissa Creek range from 4.6 to 25.6 feet (1.4 to 7.8 m) in width, with the vast majority being less than 13 feet (4 m) wide. Most of the tributaries' gradients are high, but some are low or moderate and one is extremely high. The tributaries occupy seven United States Geological Survey quadrangles: Catawissa, Shumans, Nuremberg, Conyngham, Ashland, Shenandoah, and Delano. Most of the tributaries are within several hundred meters of a road for at least part of their lengths.

The tributaries of Catawissa Creek have pHs ranging from 4.4 to 7.4. Their concentrations of alkalinity range from 0 to 42 milligrams per liter, with the significant majority having alkalinity concentrations under 20 milligrams per liter. The tributaries' concentrations of water hardness range from 0 to more than 150 milligrams per liter.

Tributaries of Catawissa Creek

Tributaries of Tomhicken Creek

Tributaries of Little Catawissa Creek

Tributaries of Messers Run

See also
List of tributaries of Fishing Creek (North Branch Susquehanna River)

Notes

References

External links
Map of the Catawissa Creek watershed

Catawissa Creek
Catawissa Creek
Tributaries of Catawissa Creek